Choseng Trungpa Rinpoche is the 12th and current Trungpa tülku. He was born on February 6, 1989, in Pawo village, in Derge, eastern Tibet. He was recognized by Tai Situ Rinpoche in 1991. He was enthroned a year later at Surmang Monastery at a ceremony presided over by Domkhar Rinpoche, a high Kagyu lama and Choseng's uncle. The monastery's late abbot (and Choseng Trungpa's predecessor), was Chogyam Trungpa Rinpoche.

He has studied the traditions of Surmang under the tutelage of the late Lama Kenla, (1932–2003), and received his early monastic education at the shedra at Palpung Monastery. He studied at Surmang Namgyal-tse until 2008, and currently studies at Serthar Institute.

The name Choseng is a contraction of Chokyi Sengay, which means "Lion of Dharma."

In 2001, he met for the first time with Sakyong Mipham Rinpoche, the son of his previous incarnation, Chögyam Trungpa.

See also
Shambhala International
Surmang

Notes

References
 Goss, Robert and Klass, Dennis (2005) Dead But Not Lost: Grief Narratives in Religious Traditions pp. 144–145 
 Midal, Fabrice (2005) Recalling Chögyam Trungpa 
 Harry Oldmeadow (2004) Journeys East: 20th Century Western Encounters with Eastern Religious Traditions

External links
 Short Biography of Choseng Trungpa at konchok.org
 Choseng Trungpa's request for Chögyam Trungpa teachings to be made available to Tibetans, 2010, (YouTube)
  Surmang Dutsi Monestery

Lamas
20th-century Buddhists
21st-century Buddhists
Rinpoches
Tulkus
1989 births
Living people
Tibetan Buddhists from Tibet